Carol Stream is a village in DuPage County, Illinois, United States, and a suburb of Chicago. Carol Stream was incorporated on January 5, 1959, and named after its founder's daughter. Per the 2020 census, the population was 39,854.

History 
In 1853, St. John Wahlund Catholic Church was built in Gretna. The church was closed in 1867. When St. Michael's was opened in Wheaton in 1872, St. Stephen's parishioners were transferred to that parish. The church building was dismantled sometime in the late 19th century. St. Stephen's Cemetery was located adjacent to the church building and was last used for burial in 1910. St. Stephen's Cemetery (located north of the Great Western Trail behind the Ozinga concrete plant on St. Charles Road) was rededicated 100 years later on September 12, 2010.

1950s
In 1952, a farm from the area was featured on NBC; it was the site for the first outdoor telecast by the network in 1954.

A common misconception is that the municipality of Carol Stream was named for a local minor waterway. In fact, Carol Stream is one of the few communities in America that took its name from the first and last names of a living person: Carol Stream, the daughter of its founder Jay Stream. Carol Stream herself moved to Arizona as an adult, living there until her death on January 18, 2020.

Jay W. Stream (April 17, 1921 – January 22, 2006), a military veteran who had previously sold insurance and ready-mix concrete, was in the mid-1950s heading Durable Construction Company.  He became frustrated with red tape while negotiating a planned 350–400 home subdivision in nearby Naperville, Illinois. A Naperville clerk reportedly advised Stream to "build your own town", and in 1957, Stream began buying unincorporated farmland outside Wheaton. He hoped to allow people to work in the town they lived in, rather than have to commute to Chicago.

On August 26, 1957, Carol and three friends were returning from Racine, Wisconsin, in a 1949 Studebaker. While attempting to cross U.S. Route 45 in central Kenosha County, the car was struck in the right rear corner, killing 15-year-old Richard Christie of Chicago, the passenger seated there. Carol was ejected through the windshield and into a utility pole. Neurosurgeons at Kenosha Memorial Hospital said the comatose girl might never awaken or, if she did, would likely be severely handicapped.  On advice of the doctors that her recovery might improve with good news, Jay decided to name the new community in her honor. After four months in a coma, Carol regained consciousness. Learning that the new village bore her full name, Carol said she thought it "odd and silly" at first (as she told Chicago Tribune reporter Eric Zorn in 1991).

Carol Stream was to be named Jacqueline Stream, but her parents changed her name to Carol when her due date fell near Christmas. She never lived in her namesake community, but moved from Wheaton, Illinois, to Arizona in 1957 following the end of her parents' marriage.  She participated in municipal celebrations and rides in parades during anniversary celebrations of the municipality's 1959 incorporation, and she was frequently asked for autographs when she was in town. She died in Arizona on January 18, 2020.

21st century 
One of the town's two middle schools, Jay Stream Middle School is named after the founder, Jay Stream, who died on January 22, 2006.

Municipal history 

1959: The village of Carol Stream is founded by Jay Stream, who envisions strong corporate growth in the area. First village board meeting on February 12.
1962: The Carol Stream Public Library opens at 397 Blackhawk Drive.
1965: The first Citizen of the Year Awards were given to Carl Bornholt and Elsie Johnson.
1966: The Carol Stream News (a paper) is founded.
1966: Nina Jo Schmale of Carol Stream is one of the eight student nurses killed by Richard Speck.
1972: The Carol Stream Fire Protection District is formed
1975: Janice Gerzevske is first woman elected Village President.
1976: As part of the United States Bicentennial celebrations, Carol Stream opens Gretna Station Museum with a July 4 dedication.
1984: The Carol Stream Association of Business and Industry is formed.
1987: Ross Ferraro is elected Mayor of Carol Stream.
1991: Village is re-certified as an Illinois certified city. Mark Bodane Appointed Fire Chief of the Carol Stream Fire District.
1992: The Carol Stream Post Office opens a regional processing center at Schmale and Fullerton. Most of the unincorporated areas around Carol Stream assume the ZIP Code of the new post office, causing some consternation among those who are used to having an address associated with Wheaton.
1992: The Carol Stream Chamber of Commerce is incorporated.
1998: The Town Center is dedicated, later to be known as the Ross Ferraro Town Center.
2003: Richard Willing becomes new police chief.
2006: Founder of Carol Stream, Jay Stream, dies January 22
2007: Frank Saverino replaces Ross Ferraro as Mayor, ending Ferraro's 20-year tenure. Mark Bodane retires as Fire Chief of Carol Stream Fire District.
2009: Carol Stream celebrates its 50th anniversary.
2023: Ms. Carol Stream dies January 18

Geography 

Demographics 
As of the 2020 census there were 39,854 people, 14,209 households, and 10,339 families residing in the village. The racial makeup of the village was 57.06% White, 6.94% African American, 0.64% Native American, 18.73% Asian, 0.03% Pacific Islander, 7.93% from other races, and 8.66% from two or more races. Hispanic or Latino of any race were 17.19% of the population.

There were 14,209 households, out of which 53.68% had children under the age of 18 living with them, 57.82% were married couples living together, 12.98% had a female householder with no husband present, and 27.24% were non-families. 21.30% of all households were made up of individuals, and 11.47% had someone living alone who was 65 years of age or older. The average household size was 3.25 and the average family size was 2.75.

The village's age distribution consisted of 21.0% under the age of 18, 9.2% from 18 to 24, 26% from 25 to 44, 28.9% from 45 to 64, and 15.1% who were 65 years of age or older. The median age was 40.1 years. For every 100 females, there were 96.8 males. For every 100 females age 18 and over, there were 96.1 males.

The median income for a household in the village was $89,820, and the median income for a family was $103,332. Males had a median income of $52,245 versus $38,920 for females. The per capita income for the village was $37,658. About 6.0% of families and 8.1% of the population were below the poverty line, including 12.4% of those under age 18 and 7.6% of those age 65 or over.

Note: the US Census treats Hispanic/Latino as an ethnic category. This table excludes Latinos from the racial categories and assigns them to a separate category. Hispanics/Latinos can be of any race.

Economy

Top employers
According to the Village's 2022 Comprehensive Annual Financial Report, the top employers in the city are:

The Christian publishers Tyndale House and Christianity Today International are based in Carol Stream.

The United States Postal Service's Sectional Hub for ZIP Codes 601 and 603 is located in this town.

Arts and culture
The Carol Stream Public Library was founded in 1977. The library features conference rooms, a create and learn center, vending cafe and an outdoor patio with a gazebo.

Parks and recreation
The Carol Stream Park District is responsible for building and maintaining public parks. There are 36 parks in the community, including:
 Armstrong Park, named after Neil Armstrong.
 Aldrin Community Center, named after Buzz Aldrin.
 Fountain View Recreation Center, which features gym basketball, open swim, and a workout facility.
 Simkus Recreation Center
 Bark Park
 Coral Cove Water Park
 McCaslin Park
 Elk Trail Recreation Center
 Veterans Memorial Plaza
 Coyote Crossing Mini Golf

Government 
Carol Stream is governed by a body known as the Legislative Board, which is composed of seven elected officials: a mayor and six trustees. Frank Saverino is the current mayor; his term of office runs from May 1, 2019, to April 30, 2023. The village clerk is also an elected position. The clerk's term of office is the same as the mayor's. A village administrator is appointed by the Legislative Board to manage the daily village operations.

Education 

Most students in Carol Stream attend school in the Consolidated School District 93, a K–8 district.  The District 93 schools in Carol Stream are: Carol Stream School, Cloverdale School, Elsie Johnson School, Heritage Lakes, Western Trails, Roy DeShane, Stratford Middle School and Jay Stream Middle School. District 93 is only K-8; thus, students must attend a different district when they reach the high school level. They are served by Glenbard Township High School District 87 (the third-largest school district in Illinois), which includes Glenbard North, located in Carol Stream.

Part of the village is served by a unit school district, the Elgin Area School District U46. Almost 40,000 children of school age are in its area. District U-46 is the second-largest in Illinois. Spring Trail Elementary in Carol Stream serves in-district students for grades K-6. These students then attend Eastview Middle School (Bartlett, Illinois) for grades 7–8. High school students who live within the U-46 boundaries attend Bartlett High School.

The western section of the village is served by Benjamin School District 25, a small, two-school district.  Evergreen Elementary School is located in Carol Stream while Benjamin Middle School is nearby in unincorporated West Chicago.  Founded in the 1840s, Benjamin 25 is one of the oldest school districts in DuPage County.  High school students from Benjamin attend West Chicago Community High School, District 94.

D-41, another School District which mainly serves Glen Ellyn, serves far southeast parts of Carol Stream (East Of Schmale Rd). There are 5 K–8 Schools.Churchill (K–5, on Carol Stream-Glen Ellyn Border), Forest Glen (K–5 in Glen Ellyn), Lincoln (K–5, in Glen Ellyn), Franklin (K–5, in Glen Ellyn), Hadley(6–8, on Glen Ellyn-Wheaton). All Students that live in Carol Stream and go to D-41 attend Glenbard West High School. Glenbard West is part of Glenbard Township High School District 87 (It also Includes Glenbard North in Carol Stream, Glenbard East in Lombard, Glenbard South also in Glen Ellyn).

Infrastructure

Transportation 
Carol Stream has six major roads running through the village. The most important of these is North Avenue, which runs relatively close to the center of Carol Stream. North Avenue is an east–west road which extends a further 30 miles east into Chicago as well as further west across the state. Army Trail Road and Geneva Road are the other major east–west roads.

Gary Avenue is a major north–south road to the commercial center of Bloomingdale and the Stratford Square Mall. County Farm Road also serves as a major commercial route for residents. Schmale Road serves a small commercial area on the southeastern side of Carol Stream. Kuhn Road also runs north–south, but is not that major.

Lies Road is a minor east–west road that bisects the village starting from Fair Oaks Road on the west to Schmale Road on the east. The portion from County Farm Road thru Kuhn Road to near Gary Avenue is the route for the annual Fourth of July parade.

A feeder line from the nearby Illinois Central Railroad serves the main industrial complex for Carol Stream. The old Gretna Railway Station had been renamed Carol Stream in 1962, the station manager of four years at the time, Frank S. Shilling, said he never found out why the station was named Gretna. The original building was preserved and moved to the Carol Stream Park District, where it serves as a museum and a home for the Carol Stream Historical Society.

See also

Notable people
Doris Karpiel, Illinois state legislator and businesswoman, lived in Carol Stream.
Justin Jackson, Detroit Lions running back
 Eric Petersen, actor. He was raised in Carol Stream.

References

External links 
 

Carol Stream Chamber of Commerce

 
Populated places established in 1853
Villages in Illinois
Chicago metropolitan area
Villages in DuPage County, Illinois
1959 establishments in Illinois